Aisling Daly (born 24 December 1987) is a retired Irish female professional mixed martial artist who last competed in the UFC women's strawweight division. Daly had been a professional MMA competitor since 2007.

Daly is well known for her participation in the reality TV series "The Ultimate Fighter: A Champion Will Be Crowned", season 20.  The 12 episodes featured a single elimination tournament that was used to determine two finalists to compete for the first ever UFC woman's straw weight belt.  Daly was eliminated in the quarterfinals, and as a result of her showing was offered and accepted a fight on the undercard of the championship fight, which she won.

Daly has competed in several divisions, including strawweight and flyweight.  Daly has trained throughout her career at Straight Blast Gym Ireland, under SBGi head coach John Kavanagh.  She received her Black Belt in Brazilian Jiu-Jitsu from SBG head coach Matt Thornton in October 2016, becoming the first Irish female to earn the prestige.

On 30 January 2017 she officially retired from MMA due to an abnormality in a routine brain scan making it unlikely for her to be cleared to fight again.

Mixed martial arts career

Early career

Daly began her professional career in Denmark against Nicole Sydboge, defeating her in the second round via guillotine choke. This was followed up by a win over Annika Sitter via TKO after 22 seconds.

Cage Rage

Daly then signed with Cage Rage and debuted against Majanka Lathouwers. Daly won the fight by armbar submission in the second round. She later competed outside of Cage Rage against Nadia van der Wel and won the fight by TKO.

Daly returned at Cage Rage 25 and defeated Aysen Berik, younger sister of Cage Rage veteran Sami Berik, via corner stoppage less than two minutes into the fight, making her the first woman to win a professional bout in Cage Rage. She then fought at Cage Rage Contenders and won via TKO, which was followed up by a win at Cage Rage 27 via rear naked choke.

Daly then made two more appearances after Cage Rage's dissolution, winning one via decision and another via TKO.

Bellator Fighting championships

Ranked as the number three female flyweight in the world and the top female mixed martial artist in Ireland, Daly signed with Bellator to compete in their women's 115 lbs tournament.

Her opening round fight was against Lisa Ellis at Bellator 26. She lost the fight via unanimous decision.

On 10 April 2011, it was announced that Daly had been released from her Bellator contract.

Daly was scheduled to return to the promotion at Bellator 66 on 20 April 2012 to face Jessica Eye in an NAAFS title rematch. However, Daly was forced to withdraw from the fight due to an ear infection.

Outside of Bellator

Daly faced Molly Helsel at Cage Warriors Fighting Championship 39 on 27 November 2010 in Cork, Ireland. She won the fight via unanimous decision.

Daly faced German Sheila Gaff at Cage Warriors Fighting Championship 41 on 24 April 2011 in North London, England. She was defeated by TKO in the first round.

She next faced Jessica Eye at NAAFS: Fight Night In The Flats 7 on 4 June 2011 in Cleveland, Ohio. Daly defeated Eye by submission due to a rear-naked choke in the second round to become NAAFS 125 lbs women's champion.

On three days' notice, Daly agreed to face Angela Hayes at Cage Warriors Fighting Championship: Fight Night 2 on 8 September 2011 in Amman, Jordan. Daly replaced Sheila Gaff, who withdrew from the fight due to illness. She defeated Hayes by armbar submission in 20 seconds.

Daly was scheduled to face Roxanne Modafferi at BlackEye Promotions 5 on 1 October 2011 in Fletcher, North Carolina. However, she was forced to withdraw from the fight due to contractual obligations to NAAFS and instead defended her title against Kelly Warren at NAAFS: Night of Champions 2011 on 23 November 2011 in Canton, Ohio. Daly defeated Warren by submission due to an armbar in the second round.

Daly had planned to compete in Ireland on 24 March 2012 at Battlezone Fighting Championships 5, but her fight was cancelled when opponent Titiana van Polanen Petel suffered a shoulder injury.

On 2 June 2012, Daly faced Rosi Sexton at Cage Warriors Fighting Championship 47. The bout was part of a tournament to crown a Cage Warriors 125-pound women's champion. Daly was defeated by unanimous decision.

Daly next competed in a 120 lbs catchweight bout against Katja Kankaanpää at Cage Warriors Fighting Championship 51 on 31 December 2012. She was defeated by unanimous decision.

Invicta Fighting championships
Daly faced Barb Honchak at Invicta Fighting Championships 3 on 6 October 2012. She was defeated via unanimous decision.

Ultimate Fighting Championship

The Ultimate Fighter
On 3 July 2014, it was announced that Daly was one of the eight remaining contestants on The Ultimate Fighter: Team Pettis vs. Team Melendez.

In the first episode of The Ultimate Fighter: Team Pettis vs. Team Melendez it was revealed that the UFC had seeded the fighters. Aisling was seeded 5th of 16 fighters and was paired with the no. 12 seed, Angela Magaña, who she fought in the preliminary round. Daly won the fight via TKO in the third round to advance in the tournament. She was defeated by no. 4 seed Jessica Penne in the quarterfinals via unanimous decision in 3 rounds.

After TUF
Daly's first fight after The Ultimate Fighter was against Alex Chambers at The Ultimate Fighter: A Champion Will Be Crowned Finale on 12 December 2014. She was successful in her debut, winning by submission in the first round.

Daly was expected to face Cláudia Gadelha on 11 April 2015 at UFC Fight Night 64. However, Gadelha pulled out of the bout in late March citing a recent muscle spasm in her back.  Subsequently, Daly was pulled from the card entirely. In turn, she was quickly re-booked and faced Randa Markos on 25 April 2015 at UFC 186. Daly lost the fight by unanimous decision.

Daly next faced Ericka Almeida on 24 October 2015 at UFC Fight Night: Holohan vs. Smolka.  She won the fight by unanimous decision.

On 30 January 2017 Daly announced her retirement following medical tests that revealed an abnormality as a result of a prior brain haemorrhage.

Mixed martial arts record

|-
|Win
|align=center|16–6
|Ericka Almeida
|Decision (unanimous)
|UFC Fight Night: Holohan vs. Smolka
|
|align=center|3
|align=center|5:00
|Dublin, Ireland
|
|-
|Loss
|align=center|15–6
|Randa Markos
|Decision (unanimous)
|UFC 186
|
|align=center|3
|align=center|5:00
|Montreal, Quebec, Canada
|
|-
| Win
| align=center| 15–5
| Alex Chambers
| Submission (armbar)
| The Ultimate Fighter: A Champion Will Be Crowned Finale
| 
| align=center| 1
| align=center| 4:53
| Las Vegas, Nevada, United States
| 
|-
| Win
| align=center| 14–5
| Karla Benitez 
| Submission (armbar) 
| Cage Warriors 63 
| 
| align=center| 2
| align=center| 4:26
| Dublin, Ireland
| 
|-
| Loss
| align=center| 13–5
| Katja Kankaanpää
| Decision (unanimous)
| Cage Warriors: 51
| 
| align=center| 3
| align=center| 5:00
| Dublin, Ireland
| 
|-
| Loss
| align=center| 13–4
| Barb Honchak
| Decision (unanimous)
| Invicta FC 3: Penne vs. Sugiyama
| 
| align=center| 3
| align=center| 5:00
| Kansas City, Kansas, United States
| 
|-
| Loss
| align=center| 13–3
| Rosi Sexton
| Decision (unanimous)
| Cage Warriors: 47
| 
| align=center| 3
| align=center| 5:00
| Dublin, Ireland
| 
|-
| Win
| align=center| 13–2
| Kelly Warren
| Submission (armbar)
| NAAFS: Night of Champions 2011
| 
| align=center| 2
| align=center| 4:39
| Canton, Ohio, United States
| 
|-
| Win
| align=center| 12–2
| Angela Hayes
| Submission (armbar)
| Cage Warriors: Fight Night 2
| 
| align=center| 1
| align=center| 0:20
| Amman, Jordan
| 
|-
| Win
| align=center| 11–2
| Jessica Eye
| Submission (rear-naked choke)
| NAAFS: Fight Night In The Flats 7
| 
| align=center| 2
| align=center| 4:00
| Cleveland, Ohio, United States
| 
|-
| Loss
| align=center| 10–2
| Sheila Gaff
| TKO (knees and punches)
| Cage Warriors: 41
| 
| align=center| 1
| align=center| 1:34
| North London, United Kingdom
| 
|-
| Win
| align=center| 10–1
| Molly Helsel
| Decision (unanimous)
| Cage Warriors 39: The Uprising
| 
| align=center| 3
| align=center| 5:00
| Cork, Ireland
| 
|-
| Loss
| align=center| 9–1
| Lisa Ellis
| Decision (unanimous)
| Bellator 26
| 
| align=center| 3
| align=center| 5:00
| Kansas City, Missouri, United States
| 
|-
| Win
| align=center| 9–0
| Maiju Kujala
| Decision (unanimous)
| Rumble in Rush 2
| 
| align=center| 3
| align=center| 5:00
| Dublin, Ireland
| 
|-
| Win
| align=center| 8–0
| Tevi Say
| TKO (punches)
| Cage of Truth 4
| 
| align=center| 1
| align=center| 2:30
| Dublin, Ireland
| 
|-
| Win
| align=center| 7–0
| Eva Liskova
| Submission (rear-naked choke)
| Cage Rage 27
| 
| align=center| 1
| align=center| 1:18
| London, United Kingdom
| 
|-
| Win
| align=center| 6–0
| Myriem el Banouti
| TKO (punches)
| Cage Rage Contenders - Ireland vs. Belgium
| 
| align=center| 1
| align=center| 1:38
| Dublin, Ireland
| 
|-
| Win
| align=center| 5–0
| Aysen Berik
| TKO (corner stoppage)
| Cage Rage 25
| 
| align=center| 1
| align=center| 1:49
| London, United Kingdom
| 
|-
| Win
| align=center| 4–0
| Nadia van der Wel
| TKO (punches)
| COT 1 – Battle on the Bay
| 
| align=center| 2
| align=center| 2:39
| Dublin, Ireland
| 
|-
| Win
| align=center| 3–0
| Myriem Lathouwers
| Submission (armbar)
| Cage Rage Contenders: Dynamite
| 
| align=center| 2
| align=center| 4:43
| Dublin, Ireland
| 
|-
| Win
| align=center| 2–0
| Annika Sitter
| TKO (punches)
| ROT 7 – The Next Level
| 
| align=center| 1
| align=center| 0:22
| Dublin, Ireland
| 
|-
| Win
| align=center| 1–0
| Nicole Sydboge
| Submission (guillotine choke)
| Adrenaline 1 – Feel the Rush
| 
| align=center| 2
| align=center| 1:00
| Hvidovre, Denmark
|

Mixed martial arts exhibition record

|-
| Loss
| align=center| 1–1
| Jessica Penne
| Decision (unanimous) 
| rowspan=2| The Ultimate Fighter: A Champion Will Be Crowned
|  (airdate)
| align=center| 3
| align=center| 5:00
| rowspan=2| Las Vegas, Nevada, United States
| 
|-
| Win
| align=center| 1–0
| Angela Magaña
| TKO (punches) 
|  (airdate)
| align=center| 3
| align=center| 2:34
|

Championships and accomplishments
 North American Allied Fight Series 125 lbs Women's Champion (One time; current)
 One successful title defence

See also

 List of Irish UFC fighters
 List of current UFC fighters
 List of female mixed martial artists

References

External links
 Aisling Daly Awakening Profile
 
 

1987 births
Living people
Irish female mixed martial artists
Irish Muay Thai practitioners
Female Muay Thai practitioners
Irish practitioners of Brazilian jiu-jitsu
People awarded a black belt in Brazilian jiu-jitsu
Female Brazilian jiu-jitsu practitioners
Strawweight mixed martial artists
Flyweight mixed martial artists
Mixed martial artists utilizing Muay Thai
Mixed martial artists utilizing Brazilian jiu-jitsu
Sportspeople from Dublin (city)
Ultimate Fighting Championship female fighters